Mathias Vosté (born 20 May 1994) is a Belgian speed skater. He competed in the 2018 Winter Olympics.

Personal records

References

External links
  (Speed Skating)
  (Short Track)
 
 
 
 

1994 births
Living people
Belgian male speed skaters
Olympic speed skaters of Belgium
Speed skaters at the 2018 Winter Olympics
Speed skaters at the 2022 Winter Olympics
21st-century Belgian people